Jack Kesy is an American actor. On television, he has portrayed Gabriel Bolivar on the FX horror drama The Strain (2014–2016) and Roller Husser on the TNT dark comedy Claws (2017–19). He also played Black Tom Cassidy in the Marvel Comics film Deadpool 2 (2018).

Early life and education
Kesy studied acting in London U.K. at the Guildhall School of Music & Drama.

Filmography

Film

Television

References

External links 
 

Living people
American male stage actors
American male television actors
American male film actors
21st-century American male actors
Place of birth missing (living people)
Year of birth missing (living people)